Snuff Bottle Connection is a 1977 Hong Kong martial arts film directed by Dung Gam-woo and Lau Lap-lap, and starring Hwang Jang-lee and John Liu. The film was released in the Hong Kong on 15 September 1977.

Plot
In the late Qing dynasty of China (The Qing dynasty followed the Ming dynasty. Their reign started as the Ming reign ended in 1636 and terminated in 1912.), the Russians are consorting with traitorous Manchus, who plan to turn over a map of the strategic points the Russians could use to invade Chinese territories. So, with the hope that he can sniff out their plan and the traitors (and not get killed like their first spy), the government sends out Chow Tien (John Lui) to investigate and spy on the visiting Russian General, Tolstoy (Roy Horan), and his lackeys. Since Tolstoy is a pistol expert, Tien gets his brother Ko (Yip Fei Yang), who is a dagger expert, and his tag along kid (Wong Yat Lung) to help aide him. Soon the plot reveals a traitorous magistrate and the key figure behind it all (Hwang Jang-lee), but the method by which the Manchu's identify themselves to the Russians, a rare snuff bottle, is stolen by Tien and his cohorts. But, Tein and crew are in the midst of enemies and must fight their way out alone in a desperate bid to save China and bring the traitors down.

Cast
 Hwang Jang-lee – Magistrate
 John Liu – Chow Tien
 Roy Horan - Tolstoy
 Yip Fei-yang - Ko
 Yuen Biao - casino fighter
 Robert Kerver - Russian Bodyguard
 Phil Cohen - Russian Bodyguard
 Corey Yuen
 Hsu Hsia
 Kim Tai-chung
 Wong Yat-lung

See also
 Hwang Jang-lee filmography
 List of Hong Kong films

External links

1977 films
1977 martial arts films
Films shot in Taiwan
Hong Kong martial arts films
1970s Mandarin-language films
1970s Hong Kong films